Södertälje-Nykvarn orientering is a Swedish orienteering club in Södertälje. Its activities are based in Tveta by the lake Måsnaren, just west to the town.

History 
It started in 1999 by merging the orienteering activities of three sports clubs: IFK Södertälje, Södertälje IF och Oxvretens SK. In 2011 it became an independent association.

IFK Södertälje 
This club got a fourth place in Tiomila in 1966.

It won the Tiomila relay in 1986, 1992, 1993 and 1996.

It won the women's relay in Tiomila in 1989

Södertälje IF 
This club won Tiomila in 1961 and come second in 1966.

Södertälje-Nykvarn orientering 
As a merged club, it won the Tiomila relay in 2005 and in 2016. In 2005 Petr Losman managed to pass Tore Sandvik from Halden SK on the arena.  In 2016 Andreu Blanes Reig got the lead on the fourth leg, which the kept until the ninth leg. Finally Jonas Leandersson managed to win with a margin of one meter.

Leandersson won three World Championships (sprint, relay and sprint relay)  as well as the Swedish Championships in sprint in 2018.

References 

Orienteering clubs in Sweden
Sport in Södertälje